Robert John DiPiero (born March 3, 1951) is an American country music songwriter. He has written 15 US number one hits and several Top 20 single for Tim McGraw, The Oak Ridge Boys, Reba McEntire, Vince Gill, Faith Hill, Shenandoah, Neal McCoy, Highway 101, Restless Heart, Ricochet, John Anderson, Montgomery Gentry, Brooks & Dunn, George Strait, Pam Tillis, Martina McBride, Trace Adkins, Travis Tritt, Bryan White, Billy Currington, Etta James, Delbert McClinton, Van Zant, Tanya Tucker, Patty Loveless, and many others.

Early years 
DiPiero was born in the steel-manufacturing center of Youngstown, Ohio.  His family moved to the suburban township of Liberty, Ohio. DiPiero graduated from Liberty High School (Ohio) in 1969. He graduated from Youngstown State University's Dana School of Music.  He participated in hard rock bands in northeastern Ohio throughout the late 1960s and 1970s.  In 1979, DiPiero moved to Nashville. He worked as a session player and traveling musician, then moved into songwriting.

Songwriting career 
DiPiero's first number one hit as a songwriter was 1983's "American Made" by The Oak Ridge Boys; it also became a national advertisements jingle for Miller Beer and Baby Ruth candybar. Since then, DiPiero co-wrote countless hit singles for other country music artists, with 15 of his songs reaching No. 1 on the country music charts. In 1995 and 1996, he received the Triple Play award from the Country Music Association for three number one singles chart in each of those years. In addition, he has 36 awards from BMI for his contributions as a songwriter. He was also one third of the country music supergroup Billy Hill; members included Dennis Robbins and John Scott Sherrill.

He helped make Nashville a port-of-call for legendary performers from all genres, writing with Neil Diamond, Carole King, Johnny Van Zant, and Delbert McClinton, among many others.

At one point, DiPiero was married to country music artist Pam Tillis, the daughter of singer Mel Tillis. The couple divorced.  On June 18, 2006, he married music publisher, Leslie Tomasino.

DiPiero launched a music industry-based reality series called "The Hitmen of Music Row" premiering September 26, 2007, on the Great American Country cable station. Songwriter participants in the series include Tony Mullins, Jeffrey Steele, and Craig Wiseman.

Awards

1984: Music City News Top Country Hit of the Year- "American Made-The Oak Ridge Boys"
1990: NSAI Award for Superior Creativity-"The Church On Cumberland Road-Shenandoah"
1993: NSAI Award for Superior Creativity-"Cleopatra, Queen of Denial-Pam Tillis"
1994: The Songwriters Guild Of America in recognition of the success of the hit song "Wink-Neal McCoy"
1994: NSAI Award for Superior Creativity-"Walking Away A Winner-Kathy Mattea"
1995: CMA Triple Play Award (Three No. 1 songs in a 12-month period) "Wink-Neal McCoy," "Take Me As I Am-Faith Hill," Till You Love Me-Reba McEntire"
1995: BMI Robert J. Burton Award Most Performed Country Song of the Year-"Wink-Neal McCoy"
1996: CMA Triple Play Award (Three No. 1 songs in a 12-month period) "Blue Clear Sky-George Strait," "Daddy's Money-Ricochet," "World's Apart-Vince Gill"
1997: Country Music Radio Awards – Song of the Year ("Worlds Apart" by Vince Gill)
1998: Nashville Music Awards – Songwriter of the Year
2000: Sony / A TV, Nashville – Songwriter of the Year.
2001: BMI 50 Most Performed Songs of the Year
2004: BMI 50 Most Performed Songs of the Year-"Cowboy's Like Us-George Strait" "You Can't Take The Honky Tonk Out Of The Girl-Brooks & Dunn"
2005: BMI Most Performed Songs of the Year-"Gone-Montgomery Gentry," "If You Ever Stop Loving Me-Montgomery Gentry"
2006: BMI 50 Most Performed Songs of the Year-"She Don't Tell Me To-Montgomery Gentry"
2007: Nashville Songwriters Hall of Fame inductee
2007: Nashville Walk of Fame inductee
2010: 17 Million-Air Honors (BMI)
2017: BMI Icon

Singles written or co-written by Bob DiPiero

1983 "American Made" – The Oak Ridge Boys
1983 "Sentimental Ol' You" – Charly McClain
1986 "That Rock Won't Roll" – Restless Heart
1986 "The First Of Me" - Dennis Robbins
1986 "Little Rock" – Reba McEntire
1988 "(Do You Love Me) Just Say Yes" – Highway 101
1989 "No Chance To Dance" - Johnny Rodriguez
1989 "The Church on Cumberland Road" – Shenandoah
1989 "Too Much Month at the End of the Money" - Billy Hill
1990 "Nickel To My Name" - Billy Hill
1990 "No Chance To Dance" - Billy Hill
1990 "Blue Angel" - Billy Hill
1992 "Anywhere but Here" – Sammy Kershaw
1992 "Blue Rose Is" – Pam Tillis
1992 "Mirror, Mirror" – Diamond Rio
1992 "Home Sweet Home" - Dennis Robbins
1992 "My Side Of Town" - Dennis Robbins
1992 "Good News, Bad News" - Dennis Robbins
1993 "Money in the Bank" – John Anderson
1993 "Cleopatra, Queen of Denial" – Pam Tillis
1994 "Kiss Me, I'm Gone" – Marty Stuart
1994 "Take Me as I Am" – Faith Hill
1994 "Wink" – Neal McCoy
1994 "Till You Love Me" – Reba McEntire
1994 "Walking Away a Winner" – Kathy Mattea
1995 "They're Playin' Our Song" – Neal McCoy
1995 "Should've Asked Her Faster" – Ty England
1996 "Blue Clear Sky" – George Strait
1996 "It's Lonely Out There" – Pam Tillis
1996 "Love You Back" – Rhett Akins
1996 "Daddy's Money" – Ricochet
1996 "See Rock City" – Rick Trevino
1997 "Worlds Apart" – Vince Gill
1998 "Bad Day to Let You Go" – Bryan White
1998 "Poor Me" – Joe Diffie
1998 "The Other Side of This Kiss" – Mindy McCready
1999 "Give My Heart to You" – Billy Ray Cyrus
1999 "Ordinary Love" – Shane Minor
2000 "There You Are" – Martina McBride
2000 "We're So Good Together" – Reba McEntire
2003 "Cowboys Like Us" – George Strait
2003 "I'll Take Love Over Money" – Aaron Tippin
2003 "You Can't Take the Honky Tonk Out of the Girl" – Brooks & Dunn
2003 "Too Much Month (At the End of the Money)" – Marty Stuart and His Fabulous Superlatives
2004 "If You Ever Stop Loving Me" – Montgomery Gentry
2004 "The Girl's Gone Wild" – Travis Tritt
2005 "Gone" – Montgomery Gentry
2005 "Hillbilly Nation" – Cowboy Crush
2005 "So Good for So Long" – Beccy Cole (Feel This Free)
2005 "XXL" – Keith Anderson
2006 "Local Girls" – Ronnie Milsap
2006 "She Don't Tell Me To" – Montgomery Gentry
2006 "Tennessee Girl" – Sammy Kershaw
2009 "Indian Summer" – Brooks & Dunn
2009 "Southern Voice" – Tim McGraw
2010 "From a Table Away" – Sunny Sweeney
2012 "Lovin' You Is Fun" – Easton Corbin
2012 "It's My Life" – Connie Britton
2014 "Drunk Americans" - Toby Keith
2014 "Headlights" – Montgomery Gentry
2015 "Boys Like You" – Who Is Fancy featuring Meghan Trainor and Ariana Grande
2018 "Tacoma" cowritten with Caitlin Smith, also performed by Garth Brooks
2020 "Me About Me" – RaeLynn

References

External links
Official website

American country guitarists
American country singer-songwriters
Living people
Writers from Youngstown, Ohio
1951 births
Country musicians from Ohio
American male singer-songwriters
Singer-songwriters from Ohio